Te Huinga Reo Selby-Rickit is a New Zealand netball player in the ANZ Championship, playing for the Southern Steel. In 2010, she was named along with Hayley Saunders from the Steel to play in the World FastNet Series. The FastNet Ferns were coached by Robyn Broughton, who is also in charge of the Steel.

In 2012, she followed Robyn Broughten to the Central Pulse, where after a solid season, she made the Silver Ferns extended squad for the first time.

She made the squad for the 2012 Fast5 Netball World Series in Auckland, in place of the injured Casey Williams, where she won a gold medal.

References

External links
ANZ Championship profile

People educated at Verdon College
New Zealand netball players
Central Pulse players
Southern Steel players
New Zealand Māori netball players
1989 births
Living people
Sportspeople from Hamilton, New Zealand
ANZ Championship players
Te Huinga
New Zealand international Fast5 players
New Zealand international netball players